The Kozienice Power Station is a coal-fired thermal power station in Świerże Górne near Kozienice, Poland. It is Poland's second largest power station with an installed capacity of 4,016 MW.

A further remarkable feature of it is that the powerlines running away from its switchyard are built as a roofstand on the top of the power station building. On 4 December 2013 four workers died in a fall, as a result of a platform failure within one of the chimneys.

See also
 Bełchatów Power Station
 Jaworzno Power Station 
 Połaniec Power Station 
 Łaziska Power Station 
 Katowice Power Station 
 List of towers
 List of power stations in Poland

References

External links
 http://www.skyscraperpage.com/diagrams/?b53779
 ENEA Wytwarzanie sp. z o.o., "Kozienice" Power Station

Energy infrastructure completed in 1973
Towers completed in 1973
Kozienice
Chimneys in Poland
Kozienice County
Buildings and structures in Masovian Voivodeship